Campanario or Campanário may refer to:

Places
El Campanario y Oradel, Tamaulipas, a city in the municipality of Nuevo Laredo, Mexico
Proyecto Campanario, a private biological station and wildlife reserve in the Osa Peninsula, Costa Rica
Campanário, Madeira, a parish in the municipality of Ribeira Brava, Madeira, Portugal
Campanário, Minas Gerais, a municipality in Minas Gerais, Brazil
Campanario, Badajoz, a town in Extremadura, Spain

Geology
Campanario Formation (Neogene), geological formation of Neogene age in Central Chile and western Argentina
Campanario Formation (Cambrian), a geological formation of Cambrian age in the Argentine Northwest

Brands
Pisco Campanario

Other
 Belfry (architecture), a bell tower (in Italian or Spanish)